Superman: The Man of Steel is a monthly comics series that ran from 1991 to 2003.

Superman: The Man of Steel may also refer to:
Superman: The Man of Steel (1989 video game)
Superman: The Man of Steel (1993 video game), a Master System game
Superman: The Man of Steel (2002 video game), a video game for Xbox
The Man of Steel (comics), a 1986 comic book limited series
Man of Steel (film), a 2013 Superman film

See also
 Man of Steel (disambiguation)